General Motors in 1988 held the largest exhibition to that date of its vehicle design and technology, called Teamwork & Technology: For Today and Tomorrow, at New York's Waldorf-Astoria hotel, site of the first Motorama exhibition in 1949.

Multi-media for the event was presented on a bank of 240 monitors produced by Bob Rogers (designer) and BRC Imagination Arts. This display was noteworthy as twice the size of the largest previous video-monitor display that time.

Introductions

 Buick Lucerne Concept
 Cadillac Voyage Concept
 Chevrolet Venture Concept
 GMC Centaur Concept
 Pontiac Banshee Concept

An unnamed sports car concept was also shown, but only as a clay model. The logo for Saturn corporation made its debut at Teamwork & Technology.

References

Auto shows in the United States
General Motors
1988 in the United States